Katell Berthelot, born in Paris on 13 February 1972, is a French historian of religions, specializing in ancient Judaism and comparing the three monotheisms. She is a director of research at the National Center for Scientific Research (CNRS) and is attached to the Paul-Albert February Center at the Maison Méditerranéenne des Sciences de l'homme (MMSH) in Aix-en-Provence. She won the Irène Joliot-Curie Prize in 2008 in the Young Female Scientist category.

Life and work 
Berthelot graduated from HEC Paris in 1993 and earned her master's degree in literature. She changed the course of her career in the 1990s after traveling to Israel for two years and studying newly discovered texts of the Bible. Her education included the history of religions at Paris Sorbonne-Paris IV University where she obtained a Diploma of Advanced Studies (DEA). She spent the following years at the Orion Center for Qumran Studies at the Hebrew University of Jerusalem. Her Sorbonne doctorate in 2001, directed by Mireille Hadas-Lebel, was on “Israel and Humanity in Jewish Thought in Hellenistic and Roman Times.” In 2002, Berthelot joined the CNRS, at the Center Paul-Albert Juillet in Aix-en-Provence as a researcher, and she was appointed a CNRS research director in October 2015.

Working with biblical manuscripts and their commentaries, her research covers the notion of humanism in ancient Greek philosophy and ancient Jewish thought, specifically the Jewish reading of the bible's story of the conquest of Canaan by the Hebrews or the universality of Jewish law.

Berthelot co-directed, with Thierry Legrand and André Paul, the bilingual edition of the Dead Sea Scrolls (Qumran) from 2006 to 2018 for the Cerf editions as well as God, an investigation, a work comparing the three great monotheisms and their commonalities as well as what distinguishes them.

From 2014 to 2019, Berthelot directed the research project "Judaism and Rome," funded by the ERC (European Council for Research).

Selected awards and distinctions 
 Prix Sophie-Barluet (2017)
 Prix Pierre-Lafue (2017)
 Irène Joliot-Curie Prize (2008)
 CNRS bronze medalist (2007)

References 

  

Living people
1972 births
French National Centre for Scientific Research awards
French National Centre for Scientific Research scientists
Research directors of the French National Centre for Scientific Research
21st-century French scientists
21st-century French women scientists
21st-century French historians
21st-century French women
Pierre and Marie Curie University alumni